U.S. Route 2 (US 2) in the U.S. state of Maine is a principal east–west route through the central portion of the state, extending from the New Hampshire border in Gilead to the town of Houlton near the Canadian border.

Route description
After crossing the New Hampshire state line in Gilead, US 2 continues to follow the Androscoggin River, turning north in Bethel (State Route 26 [SR 26] continues eastward from this turn). From there, the road crosses the river and turns north for a short while before turning eastward again, following the curving path of the river on the opposite bank until Dixfield, where it turns northeast, crossing from Oxford County, through southeastern Franklin County and into Somerset County. The road has a major junction with US 201 in Skowhegan, continuing to Penobscot County and the town of Newport, where the road begins a loosely parallel path with Interstate 95 (I-95), interchanging with the interstate just southeast of Bangor International Airport in Bangor.

From Bangor, the road begins following the Penobscot River northward, passing through Orono, crossing the river just south of the main campus of the University of Maine on Marsh Island. In Old Town, the road crosses the river again, staying to the east bank of the river through Mattawamkeag, crossing the Mattawamkeag River, then heading northward through the rest of the county and into Aroostook County, heading due north from Macwahoc, eventually meeting up again with I-95 near exit 286 in Oakfield, before crossing back at exit 291 in Smyrna. From Smyrna, the road travels due east into Houlton, sharing a concurrency with US 1 for just under  before heading east and terminating just north of Houlton International Airport at I-95 exit 305, the last exit before it changes to Route 95.

History

The original path of the road near the Houlton Airport did not turn around what is now the north–south runway, instead going straight on what is now Old Woodstock Road, over the eventual path of the runway, and crossing Airport Drive just south of the exit, meeting at the old U.S. Customs station,  due south of the current one. The corresponding Canadian road also has closed, ending  further from the border than it once did. The roadway paths are still visible on satellite imagery.

Major intersections

References

External links

Floodgap Roadgap's RoadsAroundME: US Highway 2 (Maine)

02
Transportation in Aroostook County, Maine
Transportation in Penobscot County, Maine
Transportation in Somerset County, Maine
Transportation in Franklin County, Maine
Transportation in Oxford County, Maine
 Maine